Zenepos is a genus of sea snails, marine gastropod mollusks in the family Raphitomidae.

Species
Species within the genus Zenepos include:
 † Zenepos lacunosa (Hutton, 1885) 
 Zenepos totolirata (Suter, 1908)
 Zenepos ziervogelii (Gmelin, 1791)
Species brought into synonymy
 Zenepos mimica (Sowerby III, 1897): synonym of Nepotilla mimica (Sowerby III, 1897)
 Zenepos minuta (Tenison-Woods, 1877): synonym of Nepotilla minuta (Tenison-Woods, 1877)

References

 Finlay, H. J. (1928). The Recent Mollusca of the Chatham Islands. Transactions of the New Zealand Institute. 59: 232-286 page(s): 250
 Powell, A.W.B. 1979 New Zealand Mollusca: Marine, Land and Freshwater Shells, Collins, Auckland

External links
 
 Worldwide Mollusc Species Data Base: Raphitomidae

External links
 Bouchet, P.; Kantor, Y. I.; Sysoev, A.; Puillandre, N. (2011). A new operational classification of the Conoidea (Gastropoda). Journal of Molluscan Studies. 77(3): 273-308

Raphitomidae
Gastropod genera